Zuidema is a West Frisian toponymic surname.  Notable people with the surname include:

Coen Zuidema (born 1942), Dutch chess player
Johan Zuidema (born 1948), Dutch footballer
R. Tom Zuidema (1927–2016), Dutch anthropologist
Sytse Ulbe Zuidema (1906–1975), Dutch philosopher

See also
Zuidema-Idsardi House, historic home in Erie County, New York, built for Dutch businessman John H. Zuidema

References

Surnames of Frisian origin
Dutch toponymic surnames